Boyd may refer to:
Boyd Adams
Boyd Alexander
Boyd Atkins
Boyd Banks
Boyd Bartlett
Boyd Henry Bode
Boyd Clack
Boyd A. Clark, American politician and jurist
Boyd Coddington
Boyd Converse
Boyd Cordner, Australian rugby league footballer
Boyd Devereaux
Boyd Douglas
Boyd Dowler
Boyd Dunlop Morehead
Boyd Estus
Boyd Gaines
Boyd Georgi
Boyd Gordon
Boyd Haley
Boyd Holbrook
Boyd Hoyland
Boyd Huppert
Boyd Irwin
Boyd Jones
Boyd Kane
Boyd Kestner
Boyd Kirkland
Boyd Kosiyabong
Boyd Langton
Boyd Matson
Boyd Melson, American boxer
Boyd Merriman, 1st Baron Merriman
Boyd Morgan
Boyd Mwila
Boyd Neel
Boyd Orr (politician)
Boyd K. Packer
Boyd Petersen
Boyd Jay Petersen
Boyd Raeburn
Boyd Rankin
Boyd Rice
Boyd Anderson Tackett
Boyd Tinsley
Boyd Travers
Boyd Vance
Boyd Wettlaufer
Boyd Winchester